Events in the year 2008 in Eritrea.

Incumbents 

 President: Isaias Afewerki

Events 

 June 10 – 13 – The Djiboutian–Eritrean border conflict occurred between the forces of the country and Djibouti.

Deaths

References 

 
2000s in Eritrea
Years of the 21st century in Eritrea
Eritrea
Eritrea